Kübra Dağlı (born 1996) is a Turkish Taekwondo world champion in the freestyle duo poomsae category. She won a gold medal in the over-18 section with partner Emirhan Muran in the 10th World Poomsae Championships held in Peru in 2016. She has also been a gold or silver medalist at every national championship in the category between 2018 and 2020.

Following her victory, she received extensive media coverage for days, particularly for her competing in taekwondo while wearing a headscarf. She wrote on social media, "They don't speak of my success, but of my headscarf. I don’t want this. Our success should be discussed." Milliyet newspaper columnist Asu Maro documented the two sources of criticism Dağlı faced – Muslims who saw taekwondo itself as improper for women, and secular organizations who wanted her to remove her head covering during competitions. She condemned both groups as holding "sexist ideologies" that are harmful to her and other Muslim female athletes.

Headscarves are permitted by taekwondo's international governing bodies, though Dağlı said she did have to wear a bandana instead of a hijab once, in 2013.

Her mother and her father, a boxing coach,  have been supportive of her athleticism. After trying karate, she switched to taekwondo at the age of 13. At first, she was trained by her uncle, a taekwondo coach. She has been training with her partner Emirhan Muran since 2014.

References 

Living people
Turkish female taekwondo practitioners
1996 births
21st-century Turkish women